Lakelse Lake Provincial Park is a provincial park in British Columbia, Canada located just west of Highway 37 between Terrace and Kitimat.  The name is derived from the Coast Tsimshian language word "LaxGyels" - "fresh water mussel", for the mollusk that is found on the bottom of both Lakelse Lake and Lakelse River. Prior to Lakelse Lake becoming a provincial park, Hatchery Creek, which runs throughout the park, was the site of a sockeye salmon hatchery operated by the Canadian Government between 1919 and 1936. Lakelse Lake Provincial Park was established on March 16, 1956.

The nearby Lakelse Hot Springs are located just east of the lake.

References

External links
BC Parks - Lakelse Lake Prov. Park

Provincial parks of British Columbia
Skeena Country
Hot springs of British Columbia
1956 establishments in British Columbia
Protected areas established in 1956